Lijia Subdistrict is a subdistrict in Yubei District, Chongqing, China. , it administers the following five residential neighborhoods:
Fu'an Community
Baima Community
Jiaxing Community
Jiahe Community
Jianing Community

See also 
 List of township-level divisions of Chongqing

References 

Township-level divisions of Chongqing